The Mutwa are a Muslim community found in the state of Gujarat in India and a province of Sindh in Pakistan. They are one of a number of communities of Maldhari pastoral nomads found in the Banni region of Kutch.

History and origin

The Mutwa are Qureshi Arabs, whose ancestors arrived in South Asia with Muhammad bin Qasim, the Arab conqueror of Sindh. They settled in the neighbourhood of Karachi, Hyderabad and Mirpurkhas in Sindh. One of the Talpur rulers demanded a bride from the community, and when they refused, had to flee Sindh and settled in the Banni region of Kutch.

Present circumstances

The community is concentrated in the districts of  Jetpur, Morvi, Dhoraji, Rajkot, Porbandar, Jamnagar, Junagarh and the Banni region of Kutch.  They speak Kutchi with heavy Sindhi loanwords. The community is split into two clans, the Peerana and Moorana. Both clans are of equal status, and intermarriages are common.

The Mutwa are a cattle breeding community, and have much in common cultural with other Maldhari communities such as the Halaypotra. They sell their livestock in the markets of Bhuj and Rajkot.
Due to modernisation Mutwa in Karachi have evolved towards trading and a different life style. This new generation has been quite successful in both education and business, spreading even as far as Europe and the U.S.A.

See also
Maldhari

References

Social groups of Gujarat
Tribes of Kutch
Maldhari communities
Muslim communities of India
Sindhi tribes
Sindhi tribes in India
Muslim communities of Gujarat